Axel Jørgen Nielsen (9 January 1914 – 16 September 2004), was a Danish chess player, and six-times Danish Chess Championship medalist (1944, 1946, 1948, 1954, 1955, 1959).

Biography
From the end to 1940s to the early 1960s Axel Nielsen was one of the strongest Danish chess players. In Danish Chess Championships he won 3 silver (1946, 1954, 1955) and 3 bronze (1944, 1948, 1959) medals.

Axel Nielsen played for Denmark in the Chess Olympiads:
 In 1954, at second board in the 11th Chess Olympiad in Amsterdam (+4, =5, -5),
 In 1956, at first reserve board in the 12th Chess Olympiad in Moscow (+2, =1, -4),
 In 1960, at first board in the 14th Chess Olympiad in Leipzig (+4, =4, -6).

References

External links

Axel Nielsen chess games at 365chess.com

1914 births
2004 deaths
Danish chess players
Chess Olympiad competitors
20th-century chess players